Patrick Anthony Cregg (born 21 February 1986) is an Irish football coach and former player, who is currently the assistant manager at Dundalk. During his playing career he played for Arsenal, Falkirk, Hibernian, Greenock Morton, St Mirren, Bury, St Johnstone, Shamrock Rovers, St Patrick's Athletic, Forfar Athletic and Montrose. He also represented the Republic of Ireland at youth international levels.

Career
Having come through the youth academies at Manchester United and Arsenal, Cregg started his senior career at Arsenal; his first senior appearance was in a 3–1 victory against Everton in the League Cup on 9 November 2004, as an 89th-minute substitute for Arturo Lupoli. In all he made three appearances, all of them being in the League Cup.

Cregg joined Scottish Premier League club Falkirk in January 2006 and made over 100 Scottish Premier League appearances for the club. He was released in the summer of 2009, having made his last appearance for the club in the 2009 Scottish Cup Final.

After his release by Falkirk, Cregg signed for Hibernian. Cregg followed manager John Hughes in making the move. He left Hibs at the end of the season.

Cregg then played in a reserve team friendly match for Shamrock Rovers against Manchester United. Cregg then played as a trialist for Greenock Morton in a Scottish First Division match against Ross County on 25 September 2010. The Greenock Telegraph reported on 1 October 2010 that Cregg had turned down a contract offer from Morton to sign for their Renfrewshire derby rivals St Mirren. Cregg signed for the Paisley club, agreeing a contract until January 2011.

Cregg signed a one-year contract with Bury in August 2011. In May 2012, he was released by the club after being deemed surplus to requirements.

Cregg then played for St Johnstone as a trialist in July 2012 before agreeing a one-year contract with the club.

In August 2014, Cregg signed a contract until the end of the season with League of Ireland side Shamrock Rovers.
After two and a half seasons with Rovers, Cregg signed for Dublin rivals St Patrick's Athletic on 22 November 2016 on a one-year deal. On 31 January 2017 Cregg made his Pats debut in a 4–0 Leinster Senior Cup win over Bray Wanderers at the Carlisle Grounds. After half a season with Pats in which he was in and out of the team, Cregg requested to leave and came to a mutual agreement with the club to cancel his contract on 4 July 2017.

Cregg signed for Forfar Athletic on 13 August 2017. He was released from his contract on 31 January 2018.

He spent one full season at Montrose before retiring in August 2019 to take up a role as assistant manager of his old club St Patrick's Athletic, under new manager and former Arsenal & Falkirk teammate of Cregg's, Stephen O'Donnell.

International
While he was at Arsenal, Cregg became a regular in the Republic of Ireland under-19 team. He later represented the Republic of Ireland national under-21 football team.

Career statistics

Club

Honours
St Johnstone
Scottish Cup: 2013–14

References

External links

Republic of Ireland profile at Soccer Scene

1986 births
Association football midfielders
Expatriate footballers in England
Expatriate footballers in Scotland
Arsenal F.C. players
Falkirk F.C. players
Hibernian F.C. players
Greenock Morton F.C. players
St Mirren F.C. players
Bury F.C. players
St Johnstone F.C. players
Shamrock Rovers F.C. guest players
St Patrick's Athletic F.C. players
Forfar Athletic F.C. players
Montrose F.C. players
Living people
Association footballers from Dublin (city)
Republic of Ireland association footballers
Republic of Ireland expatriate association footballers
Republic of Ireland under-21 international footballers
Republic of Ireland youth international footballers
Scottish Football League players
Scottish Premier League players
Scottish Professional Football League players
English Football League players
League of Ireland players
Irish expatriate sportspeople in England
Irish expatriate sportspeople in Scotland